Hermann Vogel (1856–1918) was a French painter and illustrator of German origin.

Vogel was born in Flensburg, Duchy of Schleswig. He came to Hamburg in 1864 and studied at the Academy of Fine Arts Munich from 1872–78. Vogel then moved to Paris and became a French citizen.

Vogel illustrated numerous books and contributed drawings and paintings to magazines, especially L'assiette de beurre. Vogel died in Paris. His son was the art publisher and journalist Lucien Vogel (1886–1954).

Sources

External links
 [ Lambiek Comiclopedia article.]

1856 births
1918 deaths
People from Flensburg
People from the Duchy of Schleswig
French people of German descent
French illustrators
19th-century French painters
French male painters
20th-century French painters
20th-century French male artists
Academy of Fine Arts, Munich alumni
19th-century French male artists